Blessing Joy Onyebuchi is a Nigerian freestyle wrestler.

Career 

In 2014, she won the bronze medal in the women's freestyle 75 kg event at the Commonwealth Games held in Glasgow, Scotland. Four years later, at the 2018 Commonwealth Games held in Gold Coast, Australia, she won the silver medal in the women's freestyle 76 kg event. In the final, she lost against Erica Wiebe of Canada.

At the 2015 African Games held in Brazzaville, Republic of the Congo, she won the silver medal in the women's 75 kg event. The following year, she competed at the 2016 African & Oceania Wrestling Olympic Qualification Tournament where she won one of the bronze medals in her event.

At the 2019 African Wrestling Championships held in Hammamet, Tunisia, she won the gold medal in the women's freestyle 76 kg event. She also represented Nigeria at the 2019 African Games held in Rabat, Morocco and she won the gold medal in the women's 76 kg event. In the same year, she also competed at the World Beach Games where she won the gold medal in the women's +70 kg beach wrestling event.

In 2020, she won the silver medal in the women's freestyle 76 kg event at the African Wrestling Championships held in Algiers, Algeria. In the final, she lost against Samar Amer of Egypt.

Achievements

References

External links 
 

Living people
Year of birth missing (living people)
Place of birth missing (living people)
Nigerian female sport wrestlers
Wrestlers at the 2014 Commonwealth Games
Wrestlers at the 2018 Commonwealth Games
Commonwealth Games medallists in wrestling
Commonwealth Games silver medallists for Nigeria
Commonwealth Games bronze medallists for Nigeria
African Games gold medalists for Nigeria
African Games silver medalists for Nigeria
African Games medalists in wrestling
Competitors at the 2015 African Games
Competitors at the 2019 African Games
African Wrestling Championships medalists
21st-century Nigerian women
Medallists at the 2014 Commonwealth Games
Medallists at the 2018 Commonwealth Games